The 2015 Players' Championship was held from April 7 to 12 at the Mattamy Athletic Centre in Toronto, Ontario. It was the fifth and final Grand Slam of the 2014–15 World Curling Tour.

Sault Ste. Marie's Brad Jacobs rink won their first men's title, while Scotland's Eve Muirhead rink won their second women's title.

Men

Teams
The teams are listed as follows:

Round-robin standings
Final Standings

Round-robin results

Draw 1
Tuesday, April 7, 7:00 pm

Draw 2
Wednesday, April 8, 8:30 am

Draw 3
Wednesday, April 8, 12:00 pm

Draw 4
Wednesday, April 8, 3:30 pm

Draw 5
Wednesday, April 8, 7:30 pm

Draw 7
Thursday, April 9, 12:00 pm

Draw 9
Thursday, April 9, 7:30 pm

Draw 11
Friday, April 10, 12:00 pm

Draw 12
Friday, April 10, 4:00 pm

Draw 13
Friday, April 10, 7:30 pm

Tiebreaker
Saturday, April 20, 8:30 am

Playoffs

Quarterfinals
Saturday, April 11, 3:30 pm

Semifinals
Sunday, April 12, 10:00 am

Final
Sunday, April 12, 7:00 pm

Women

Teams
The teams are listed as follows:

Round-robin standings
Final round-robin standings

Round-robin results

Draw 1
Tuesday, April 7, 7:00 pm

Draw 2
Wednesday, April 8, 8:30 am

Draw 3
Wednesday, April 8, 12:00 pm

Draw 4
Wednesday, April 8, 3:30 pm

Draw 5
Wednesday, April 8, 7:30 pm

Draw 6
Thursday, April 9, 8:30 am

Draw 7
Thursday, April 9, 12:00 pm

Draw 8
Thursday, April 9, 3:30 pm

Draw 10
Friday, April 10, 8:30 am

Draw 11
Friday, April 10, 12:00 pm

Draw 12
Friday, April 10, 4:00 pm

Tiebreaker
Saturday, April 11, 8:30 am

Playoffs

Quarterfinals
Saturday, April 11, 12:00 pm

Semifinals
Sunday, April 12, 10:00 am

Final
Sunday, April 12, 2:00 pm

References

Players' Championship
Players' Championship
Curling in Toronto
Players' Championship